The Dowelmax is a loose tenon dowelling jig manufactured by the O.M.S. Tool company in Canada. The precision manufacturing adds to the unit's cost, which is higher than other dowelling jigs.

The tool allows the placement of five dowels in one pass. A distance gauge bar provided with the jig allows accurate spacing between sets of dowels.

Joint strength
Tests by both the manufacturer, and Wood magazine, are claimed to show that dowel joints made with the Dowelmax are stronger than most other woodworking joints tested.

In 2007, Wood magazine compared the joint strength of various loose tenon methods and tools, with these results:

A 2011 review by Wood Magazine, has rated Dowelmax very highly as a dowel joinery tool. The review classifies Dowelmax as "the best dowelling jig ever made".

Independent test

Hydraulic comparison strength testing by manufacturer

See also
Biscuit joiner — another loose tenon joinery method
Domino joiner — another loose tenon joinery method

References

Woodworking hand tools
Woodworking
Joinery